Waste 'Em All is the debut album by thrash metal band Municipal Waste. This album caused the band to receive the attention of Earache Records, which the band signed to in May 2004. The album's name pays homage to Metallica's debut album, Kill 'Em All. Members on this album are Tony Foresta, Ryan Joy, Andy Harris, and Brandon Ferrell.

Track listing

References

Municipal Waste (band) albums
2003 debut albums